Capua endocypha is a moth of the family Tortricidae. It was described by Edward Meyrick in 1931. It is found on Fiji and in Singapore.

The wingspan is about 24 mm.

The larvae feed on Rhizophoraceae species. They feed on the closed apical leaf buds of their host plant when young. Later, they feed on newly expanding leaves which they web together.

References

Moths described in 1931
Capua (moth)